Cugand is a commune in the Vendée department in the Pays de la Loire region in western France. It is part of the urban unit of Clisson.

Geography 

Cugand is located along the Sèvre Nantaise. Its neighboring communes are:
 In Vendée 
 La Bernardière
 La Bruffière
In Loire-Atlantique : 
 Clisson
 Gétigné
 Saint-Hilaire-de-Clisson
 Boussay

Local life

Sport 
 Sportive Union Bernardière Cugand : football division
 Basketball Association Cugand Bernardière : basketball division
 St Michel Handball : handball division
 "Les raquettes Cugandaises" : tennis division
 Athlétisme Mingot Association : athletics division
 TTAL Cugand : table tennis division

Schools 
 Private elementary school St Michel / Jeanne d'Arc
 Public elementary school Jean Moulin

Culture 
 Cugandan library
 World dance and music festival

Events 
 "Festival de Cugand", world dance and music, folk bands of the all world, during 4 days in August ( 20 000 spectators in 2005 for the 7th festival edition)

See also
Communes of the Vendée department

References

Communes of Vendée